Elections to the Upper House of the Althing were held in Iceland on 1 July 1926. Six seats were elected by proportional representation at the national level, using the D'Hondt method. The remaining eight seats were elected along with the Lower House.

Results

By-election
A by-election was held on 23 October 1926.

References

Elections in Iceland
Iceland
Parliament
Iceland